These are the list of awards received by Psy, a South Korean entertainer and singer-songwriter.


Awards and nominations

Other accolades

Recognitions

World records

Listicles

Notes

References

External links

Psy
Awards